Provincial roads in Istanbul Province are maintained by KGM.

Provincial road 34-02

Provincial road 34-07

Provincial road 34-08

Provincial road 34-11

Provincial road 34-12

The motorway is a connector route linking the motorway O-1 (Istanbul Inner Beltway) to the motorway O-2 (Istanbul Outer Beltway), where it becomes the O-4 (Anatolian Motorway). The route is one of two motorways linking the two beltways on the Asian side of the city, the other being the Şile Motorway.

Provincial road 34-13

Provincial road 34-25

Provincial road 34-27

Provincial road 34-27, named the Samadıra–Kartal connector, is a  highway that connects the motorway O-4 to the state highway D.100 in Istanbul, Turkey. A provincial road is governed under the responsibility of the respective Turkish provincial government, and bears the license plate number of that province in the road identification number's first half. It is one of the three connectors between the two roads in the Istanbul metropolitan area. The route begins at exit K2 on the O-4 and heads south through two large parks, the Kayışdağı and Aydos forests, until reaching Kartal and connecting to the D.100. After the interchange, the connector becomes Sanayi Cad. ("Industry Avenue") and continues as a surface street. The connector was built in 1991.

Provincial road 34-28

Provincial road 34-81

Provincial road 34-84

Provincial road 34-85

Provincial road 34-86

Provincial road 34-89

Provincial road 34-90

References

Provincial roads in Turkey